Egils saga einhenda ok Ásmundar berserkjabana, or The Story of Egil One-Hand and Asmund Berserkers-Slayer, is a legendary saga, which takes place in Russia (Rússía), a country located between Gardariki and Hunaland, the land of the Huns. There are also adventures in Halogaland and Jotunheim, the realm of giants (Jotuns). Asmund is also known as Gnodar-Asmund and under this name he is mentioned in various other sagas. His foster-father was Illugi, who has a saga of his own in Illuga saga Gríðarfóstra.

As the name suggests, it deals with battles between berserkers.

The saga is believed to have been written down in the 14th century. It is known through Icelandic manuscripts, the oldest attested ones from the early 15th century. Its first printed edition was published by the Swedish scholar Petter Salan in 1693, under the title Fortissimorum pugilum Egilli et Asmundi historiam antqvo gothico sermone exaratam.

References

External links
The saga in Old Norse at heimskringla.no
The saga in Old Norse at Snerpa.is

Legendary sagas